Tulcus lycimnia is a species of beetle in the family Cerambycidae. It was described by Dillon and Dillon in 1945.

References

lycimnia
Beetles described in 1945